Daniel N'Dene Bekono (born 31 May 1978) is a Cameroonian former professional footballer who played as a goalkeeper.

Club career
In 1999, Bekono played for Canon Yaounde before joining Fovu Baham in 2003 after a brief stint in Brunei.

In 2003, he moved to Bulgarian side PFC Beroe Stara Zagora. After five years in Beroe he moved to PFC CSKA Sofia, where he was considered a regular in the starting 11 before the arrival of Ivaylo Petrov in the winter of 2009. In 2006, while part of the Beroe squad, he became the first black player to captain a team in the A PFG. Daniel then (after leaving CSKA Sofia) worked as a woodcutter with his cousin in Vienna, Austria.

International career
Bekono was part of the victorious Cameroon national teams at the 2000 African Nations Cup and 2000 Summer Olympics.

Personal life
Bekono has Bulgarian citizenship.

Honours
CSKA Sofia
 Bulgarian First League: 2008
 Bulgarian Supercup: 2008

Canon Yaounde
 Elite One: 2002
 Cameroonian Cup: 1999

Brunei DPMM FC
 Visit Brunei Invitational Cup: 2002

Cameroon
 Africa Cup of Nations: 2000
 2000 Summer Olympics

References

1978 births
Living people
Cameroonian footballers
Footballers from Yaoundé
Association football goalkeepers
Cameroon international footballers
Footballers at the 2000 Summer Olympics
2000 African Cup of Nations players
Olympic footballers of Cameroon
Olympic gold medalists for Cameroon
First Professional Football League (Bulgaria) players
PFC Beroe Stara Zagora players
PFC CSKA Sofia players
Canon Yaoundé players
Fovu Baham players
Olympic medalists in football
Medalists at the 2000 Summer Olympics
Cameroonian expatriate footballers
Cameroonian expatriate sportspeople in Bulgaria
Expatriate footballers in Bulgaria
Cameroonian expatriate sportspeople in Brunei
Expatriate footballers in Brunei
Cameroonian expatriate sportspeople in Japan
Expatriate footballers in Japan